

Track listing
"Adonai"
"Supertones Strike Back"
"Unknown"
"Resolution"
"Hallelujah"
"What It Comes To"
"Grounded"
"OC Supertones"
"Away From You"
"Little Man"
"Who Can Be Against Me"
"Unite"

References

2012 albums
The O.C. Supertones albums